The 1939 Quebec general election was held on October 25, 1939, to elect members of the Legislative Assembly of the Province of Quebec, Canada. The Quebec Liberal Party, led by former premier Adélard Godbout, defeated the incumbent Union Nationale, led by Maurice Duplessis.

This was Godbout's second non-consecutive term of office and his only victory out of four consecutive general elections opposing Duplessis.

The Action libérale nationale, which had won 25 seats in the 1935 election and then merged with the Quebec Conservative Party, was re-formed by Paul Gouin, who had split with Duplessis soon after the formation of the Union Nationale.  However the ALN obtained only 4.5% of the vote and no seats. It soon disbanded.  Also, a rump Conservative Party ran three candidates who won 0.2% of the vote and no seats. This party also disbanded.

Redistribution of ridings
An Act passed before the election reduced the number of MLAs from 90 to 86 through the following changes:

Results

|-
! colspan=2 rowspan=2 | Political party
! rowspan=2 | Party leader
! colspan=4 | MPPs
! colspan=4 | Votes
|-
! Candidates
!1936
!1939
!±
!#
! ±
!%
! ± (pp)
|-

|style="text-align:left;"|Adélard Godbout
|85
|14
|69
|55
|301,382
|77,008
|53.50
|14.09
|-
|rowspan="3" |  
|style="text-align:left;" colspan="10"|Union Nationale and allies
|-
|style="text-align:left;" |
|style="text-align:left;"|Maurice Duplessis
|84
|76
|14
|62
|217,413
|106,399
|38.60
|18.28
|-
|style="text-align:left;" |
|style="text-align:left;"|–
|1
|–
|1
|1
|2,989
|
|0.53
|
|-
| style="background-color:#D9B2FF;" |  
| style="text-align:left;" |Action libérale nationale
|style="text-align:left;"|Paul Gouin
|56
|–
|–
|–
|25,295
|
|4.49
|
|-
| style="background-color:#FF5555;" |  
| style="text-align:left;" |Parti national
|style="text-align:left;" |–
|1
|–
|1
|1
|3,074
|
|0.55
|
|-
|rowspan="11" |  
|style="text-align:left;" colspan="10"|Other candidates
|-
|style="text-align:left;" |
|style="text-align:left;"|–
|5
|–
|1
|1
|6,281
|5,514
|1.12
|0.99
|-
|style="text-align:left;" |
|style="text-align:left;"|–
|1
|–
|–
|–
|2,513
|1,044
|0.45
|0.19
|-
|style="text-align:left;" |
|style="text-align:left;"|–
|3
|–
|–
|–
|1,679
|191
|0.30
|0.03
|-
|style="text-align:left;" |
|style="text-align:left;"|–
|3
|–
|–
|–
|788
|8,958
|0.14
|1.57
|-
|style="text-align:left;" |
|style="text-align:left;"|–
|1
|–
|–
|–
|617
|
|0.11
|
|-
|style="text-align:left;" |
|style="text-align:left;"|–
|3
|–
|–
|–
|469
|1,459
|0.08
|0.26
|-
|style="text-align:left;" |
|style="text-align:left;"|–
|3
|–
|–
|–
|410
|331
|0.07
|0.06
|-
|style="text-align:left;" |
|style="text-align:left;"|–
|1
|–
|–
|–
|228
|
|0.04
|
|-
|style="text-align:left;" |
|style="text-align:left;"|–
|1
|–
|–
|–
|159
|886
|0.03
|0.15
|-
|style="text-align:left;" |
|style="text-align:left;"|–
|colspan="8" style="text-align:center;"|did not campaign
|-
! colspan="3" style="text-align:left;" | Total
| 248
| 90
! " colspan="2"| 86
! " colspan="2"| 563,297
! " colspan="2"| 100%
|-
| colspan="7" style="text-align:left;" | Rejected ballots
| 7,334
| 2,404
| colspan="2"|
|-
| colspan="7" style="text-align:left;" | Voter turnout
| 570,631
| 3,624
| 77.00
| 0.06
|-
| colspan="7" style="text-align:left;" | Registered electors (contested ridings only)
| 741,131
| 5,283
| colspan="2"|
|-
| colspan="5" style="text-align:left;" | Candidates returned by acclamation
| 1
| 1
| colspan="4"|
|}

See also
 List of Quebec premiers
 Politics of Quebec
 Timeline of Quebec history
 List of Quebec political parties
 21st Legislative Assembly of Quebec

References

Quebec general election
Elections in Quebec
General election
Quebec general election